The Family (released as Malavita and Cosa Nostra in some countries) is a 2013 black comedy crime film co-written and directed by Luc Besson, starring Robert De Niro, Michelle Pfeiffer, Tommy Lee Jones, Dianna Agron, and John D'Leo. It follows a Mafia family in the witness protection program who want to change their lives. It is based on the French novel Malavita (Badfellas in the 2010 English translation) by Tonino Benacquista.

Plot
Mafia boss Giovanni Manzoni, who offended Don Lucchese, a rival mafia boss, survives an attempted hit on him and his family at a barbecue. He snitches on Lucchese, which sends him to prison. Manzoni and his immediate family enter an FBI witness protection program under the supervision of Agent Robert Stansfield, and have been relocated various times, the latest being a small town in Normandy.

In adjusting to life in the village, each family member runs into trouble. They are being watched by two FBI agents to ensure their safety. Giovanni claims to be an author writing a historical novel on the Normandy landings, which is problematic as many citizens in the area are much more familiar with the event than he is. He finds ways to slip away to discover why the water in his house is brown. He beats a plumber who tries to unnecessarily change all the pipes in his house, and a local fertilizer factory owner who is responsible for the tainted water.

Daughter Belle falls in love with Henri, a college student working as a substitute math teacher. She asks for private math lessons so she can spend time alone with him and seduce him. Giovanni's wife, Maggie, blows up a small grocery store when its owner spews anti-American comments in French to the other customers and often visits the undercover FBI agents. She spends a lot of time at the church, where she and the local priest have an amicable relationship. However, their friendship ends when she confesses their crimes and he tells her never to come back.

On the first day of class at the local school, son Warren, is beaten up by a small group, but he creates a mini-mafia within the school. This allows him to beat up the original small group that first bullied him. He inadvertently alerts Don Luchese to their location when he quotes one of the kingpin's sayings in the school paper, which makes its way to Luchese by chance.

Giovanni is asked to attend an American film event due to his supposed historical expertise and he brings Agent Stansfield along, claiming to want to bond with him. It it is in fact an alibi for a timed explosive rigged to destroy the fertilizer causing his brown water. The film screening takes an unexpected turn when instead of Some Came Running, the scheduled film, they instead watch Goodfellas. Throughout the film, Giovanni expresses a desire to talk about his life as a mobster. The debate after the film prompts him to tell his story to the audience. Feeling the cover has been compromised, Agent Stansfield gives the order to relocate the family again.

Meanwhile, the school detects Warren's activities so he decides to leave town with a fake passport to establish his own mafia family in Paris, afraid that the FBI will drop the family's protection. At the train station, he sees seven hitmen arrive and head for town. He returns home to warn the family. Henri breaks up with Belle, which causes her to contemplate suicide, but she stops when she sees the hitmen enter the police station and kill several officers. Maggie returns home and finds her children gone, so she goes to ask the FBI surveillance team for help. Giovanni returns home and Maggie goes to speak with him, but sees the hitmen. She returns to the FBI safe house across the street.

The hitmen blow up the family's house and kill neighbors who leave their homes to investigate. Soon an intense gunfight ensues which involves all family members. Giovanni and Maggie strangle and stab a hitman after he raids the safe house and tries to sexually assault Maggie. Belle kills a hitman who went to look for weapons in his car's trunk. Using weapons she found in the trunk, she shoots one of the five hitmen near the burning house. Warren also gets guns from the car and shoots two of the hitmen while being given cover fire by Belle. One hitman is killed by the family dog. While chasing Belle, the lead hitman is killed by Stansfield's car.

The family relocates again. Despite numerous innocent townspeople having been slaughtered, Giovanni expresses his happiness at having had the chance to tell his story, saying that it brought the family closer.

Cast
 Robert De Niro as Fred Blake / Giovanni Manzoni, the father.
 Michelle Pfeiffer as Maggie Blake / Maggie Manzoni, the mother.
 Dianna Agron as Belle Blake / Belle Manzoni, the daughter.
 John D'Leo as Warren Blake / Warren Manzoni, the son.
 Tommy Lee Jones as Robert Stansfield, the FBI agent.
 Jimmy Palumbo as Di Cicco, an FBI agent
 Domenick Lombardozzi as Caputo, an FBI agent
 Stan Carp as Don Luchese, a mafia boss
 Vincent Pastore as Willy "Fat Willy", a mafia Capo
 Jonas Bloquet as André
 Jon Freda as Rocco
 Michael J. Panichelli Jr. as Billy "The Bug"
 Paul Borghese as Albert
 Anthony Desio as Bernie
 Ted Arcidi as Tommy
 David Belle as Mezzo
 Oisín Stack as Henri
 Victoire Du Bois as Pink Ribbon Girl
 Côme Levin as J.P.

Production

Development
EuropaCorp and Relativity Media signed during March 2012 to develop two films, including their distribution. The Family would become the first one, and the second one would be Three Days to Kill (2014).

The script, written by Luc Besson and Michael Caleo, is based on the novel Malavita by Tonino Benacquista, published in 2004. The author did not want to be very involved in the development of the film, he said: "I knew that EuropaCorp would be capable of producing a film that could be distributed, both in the United States and France, and it was a very tempting topic". The producer of the film, Virginie Besson-Silla, said that the film's storyline is nearly the same as the novel's.

Originally, Besson would be only the producer. But after finding out that he was going to work with Robert De Niro and not finding a proper director, he decided to direct the film as well: "I thought that it was out of the question to entrust this project to any other person! I know the American and French cultures, so I decided to make me the director." De Niro asked Besson why he was not the director, and Besson told him: "Okay, you won."

Casting
The book's author wanted the cast to be "American actors that have their own legend, and when appearing on the big screen, they don't have to convince." When Besson asked him who he wanted to be the lead role, he proposed Robert De Niro. They sent him a letter, and later De Niro agreed to participate in the project.

In June 2012, it was confirmed that Michelle Pfeiffer would join the cast of The Family, as she was interested in working with De Niro. They had starred together in different films but never were able to film scenes with each other. Author Tonino Benacquista was very [pleased with the casting of De Niro and Pfeiffer; Besson later said, "Tonino said it would be so perfect if Robert De Niro and Michelle Pfeiffer played the roles. It was like a dream." Besson always thought of Dianna Agron while writing the character Belle Blake. Despite this, Agron had to attend multiple auditions. Agron later won the part. The entire Glee cast and crew supported Agron's departure from the show to be part of the film. A dog named Emeron was chosen to be Malavita, the family's pet dog. Emeron was trained by a specialist, and De Niro was the only person, beside the dog trainer, to spend time with him during the workout. Besson auditioned more than 500 actors for the character of Warren Blake, before casting D'Leo. The Family was De Niro's 96th feature film.

Filming
Principal photography began 8 August 2012 and completed on 27 October 2012.

Filming took place in the locations of both Gacé and Le Sap in Normandy, and in New York City. Some of the filming also took place L'Aigle and at Cité du Cinéma in Saint-Denis for 1 month.

Title
In May 2013, it was revealed that the film, originally titled Malavita, would be re-titled The Family in the United States and some English-speaking countries. In some countries, including France, the Malavita title was retained.

Music

The Family (Original Motion Picture Soundtrack) was released on 13 September 2013, the same day of the film's premiere. It includes original compositions by Evgueni and Sacha Galperine.

"Clint Eastwood" and "To Binge" by Gorillaz are used in the film but does not appear on the soundtrack album.
Another song that does not appear on the soundtrack, but appears in the film nonetheless, is "Genius of Love" by Tom Tom Club. The song plays in the background during the barbeque scene.

Release
The first trailer of The Family was released on 4 June 2013. For France, the first trailer for Malavita was released in mid-July 2013. In August, some TV spots were released to promote the film. The film was initially set to be released, by Relativity Media, on 18 October 2013, then changed to 20 September 2013. The film was eventually pushed up to 13 September 2013.

Home media
The Family was released on DVD and Blu-ray on 17 December 2013.

Reception

Critical response
Rotten Tomatoes shows that 29% of 127 reviews rated it positively; the average rating is 4.6/10. The site's consensus is: "Luc Besson's The Family suffers from an overly familiar setup and a number of jarring tonal shifts." Another review aggregator, Metacritic, which assigns a rating out of 100 top reviews from mainstream critics, calculated a score of 42 based on 32 reviews.

Ignatiy Vishnevetsky from The A.V. Club gave the film a B−, and said: "Besson creates the impression that The Family is set in a world drawn from gangster movies and comic strips—an idea that culminates in De Niro participating, as the town’s token American, in a film club discussion of a certain Martin Scorsese movie." Stephanie Merry of The Washington Post gave the film one out of four stars, stating: "There’s little to laugh about in the dark comedy The Family." Nick Schager of Time Out gave the film one out of five stars, saying that Besson "treats his protagonists as likable cartoons yet never provides a single reason to view them as anything less than remorseless, repugnant psychos." MSN Entertainment gave the film three out of five stars, saying: "Sharper, smarter and slicker than it looks, there's a lot to like about The Family."

Linda Barnard from The Toronto Star gave the film two out of four stars, saying: "While Besson knows his way around an action film, he’s not as adept at comedy. The result is an often-violent, occasionally amusing fish-out-of-eau tale that plunks a family of wise guys in the French countryside with predictable results." Mack Rawden of CinemaBlend gave the film three out of five stars, saying: "It uses irregular De Niro voiceovers on occasion. It reads segments of a book on occasion. It even uses bad dreams and flashbacks, all of which, when used together, make the film seem disorganized and poorly put together. All of that, coupled with more than a few jokes that fall flat and a plot that’s windy and strangely paced keep The Family from being anything more than a likeable enough way to spend an hour and forty-five minutes." Stephen Holden of The New York Times summed up the mixed reaction to the film: "The movie has holes galore. It has abrupt tonal shifts, an incoherent back story and abandoned subplots.... But buoyed by hot performances, it sustains a zapping electrical energy."

Although the film did not generate many positive reviews, the cast was praised by critics. THV11 said: "The core actors of The Family were really solid and the whole film comes together to make a solid movie." The Huffington Post said that: "De Niro, Pfeiffer and Jones all brought 100% to their roles. Glee actress Dianna Agron was the stand-out here, shining as the daughter who was falling in love for the first time, while defending her family from total annihilation by the mafia." The film was nominated for one award: the Women Film Critics Circle Awards Best Young Actress for Agron.

Box office
The Family debuted at number two in its first weekend, with $14 million, coming in behind Insidious: Chapter 2, which made $40.3 million in its opening weekend.

References

External links

 
 
 
 
 
 

2013 films
2013 action comedy films
2013 black comedy films
2013 crime action films
2010s crime comedy films
2010s English-language films
American action comedy films
American black comedy films
American crime action films
American crime comedy films
English-language French films
EuropaCorp films
Films about contract killing
Films about dysfunctional families
Films about witness protection
Films based on crime novels
Films based on French novels
Films directed by Luc Besson
Films produced by Luc Besson
Films set in 1996
French films set in New York City
Films set in Normandy
Films set in Paris
Films shot in New York City
Films shot in Normandy
Films shot in Paris
French action comedy films
French black comedy films
French crime action films
French crime comedy films
Mafia comedy films
Relativity Media films
2010s American films
2010s French films